Horse Guard State Park is a public recreation area covering  in the town of Avon, Connecticut. The state park is managed by the Connecticut Department of Energy and Environmental Protection.

History
The park has seen little development since the land's purchase by the state in 1964. It was named for the  First Company Governor's Horse Guards, founded in 1788 and the oldest active mounted cavalry unit in the U.S.

Activities and amenities
A white-blazed trail begins near the Avon Historical Society's Derrin House on West Avon Road (State Route 167).

References

External links
 Horse Guard State Park Connecticut Department of Energy and Environmental Protection

State parks of Connecticut
Avon, Connecticut
Parks in Hartford County, Connecticut
Protected areas established in 1964
1964 establishments in Connecticut